Callum Graham Jones (born 5 April 2001) is a professional footballer who plays as a midfielder for Hull City. Born in England, he represents Wales internationally.

Early career
Jones is a youth product of The New Saints, Oswestry Town, and Bury.

Club career

Hull City
On 17 October 2019, Jones signed a professional contract with Hull City for one year. Jones made his professional debut with Hull in a 2–1 EFL Trophy defeat to Leicester City U21s on 8 September 2020. He scored his first goal for the club, also in the EFL Trophy, in a 2–0 win over Harrogate Town on 10 November 2020, where he was also captain. On 6 January 2021, Jones signed a new two-and-a-half-year contract with Hull City. On 27 January 2023, Jones signed a new two-and-a-half-year contract with Hull City.

Morecambe (loan)
On 16 June 2021, Jones signed a season long loan deal with Morecambe. On 18 January 2022, Jones was recalled by Hull City.

Grimsby Town (loan)
On 5 March 2022, Jones signed a month-long loan deal with Grimsby Town. 
He made his debut the same day in a 1–0 victory at Blundell Park.

On 20 March 2022, following an injury which would rule him out for the rest of the season, Jones returned to Hull City.

International career
Born in England, Jones is of Welsh descent through a grandmother. He is a youth international for Wales, having first represented the Wales U18s in 2018.

Career statistics

References

External links
 
 Soccerbase Profile
 Hull City Tigers Profile

2001 births
Living people
Welsh footballers
Wales youth international footballers
English footballers
English people of Welsh descent
Association football midfielders
English Football League players
National League (English football) players
Hull City A.F.C. players
Morecambe F.C. players
Grimsby Town F.C. players